Jessamyn Maribel Sauceda de la Trinidad (born 22 May 1989) is a Mexican athlete competing in the long jump and combined events. She represented her country in the long jump at the 2017 World Championships without qualifying for the final.

Her personal bests in the long jump are 6.74 metres outdoors (-0.6 m/s, Mexico City 2017) and 6.02 metres indoors (Albuquerque 2016).

International competitions

Personal bests
Outdoor
200 metres – 24.53 (+1.1 m/s, Monterrey 2016)
800 metres – 2:20.46 (Austin 2016)
100 metres hurdles – 13.96 (+0.7 m/s, Azusa 2015)
High jump – 1.74 (Toronto 2015)
Long jump – 6.74 (-0.6 m/s, Mexico City 2017) NR
Shot put – 12.66 (Monterrey 2016)
Javelin throw – 40.04 (Austin 2016)
Heptathlon – 5786 (Toronto 2015) NR
Indoor
60 metres hurdles – 8.63 (Albuquerque 2016)
Long jump – 6.02 (Albuquerque 2016)

References

1989 births
Living people
Mexican female long jumpers
Mexican heptathletes
World Athletics Championships athletes for Mexico
Athletes (track and field) at the 2015 Pan American Games
Pan American Games competitors for Mexico
Competitors at the 2014 Central American and Caribbean Games
Competitors at the 2018 Central American and Caribbean Games